Morris may refer to:

Places

Australia 

St Morris, South Australia, place in South Australia

Canada 

 Morris Township, Ontario, now part of the municipality of Morris-Turnberry
 Rural Municipality of Morris, Manitoba
 Morris, Manitoba, a town mostly surrounded by the municipality
 Morris (electoral district), Manitoba (defunct)
 Rural Municipality of Morris No. 312, Saskatchewan

United States 

Communities
 Morris, Alabama, a town
 Morris, Connecticut, a town
 Morris, Georgia, an unincorporated community
 Morris, Illinois, a city
 Morris, Indiana, an unincorporated community
 Morris, Minnesota, a city
 Morristown, New Jersey, a town
 Morris (town), New York
 Morris (village), New York
 Morris, Oklahoma, a city
 Morris, Pennsylvania, an unincorporated community
 Morris, West Virginia, an unincorporated community
 Morris, Kanawha County, West Virginia, a ghost town
 Morris, Wisconsin, a town
 Morris Township (disambiguation)

Counties and other
 Morris County, Kansas
 Morris County, New Jersey
 Morris County, Texas
 Morris Creek (South Dakota)
 Morris Island, Charleston Harbor, South Carolina
 Morris Plains, New Jersey
 Morris Reservoir, California
 Mount Morris (disambiguation)

Ships 

 , various ships
 USCS Morris, a survey ship with the United States Coast Survey in service from 1849 to 1855
 Mr. Morris former USS AFDM-2 an Auxiliary floating drydock in Port Arthur, Texas

Companies 

 Morris & Co., a company manufacturing items of decorative art
 Morris & Company, an early 20th century meatpacking company
 Morris Air, a former low-fare airline, now part of Southwest Airlines
 Morris Communications, an American publishing company
 Morris Motors, a former British car manufacturer
 Morris Multimedia, an American publishing company

People 

 Morris (given name), a first name (including a list of people with the name) 
 Morris (surname), a family name (including a list of people with the name)
 Lord Morris (disambiguation), various people and titles
 Morris, one of the 14 merchant families known as the Tribes of Galway, Ireland
 Morris family (disambiguation)
 Morris (cartoonist), pseudonym for the Belgian cartoonist Maurice De Bevere (1923–2001)
 Morris (singer), stage name of Romanian singer Marius Iancu (born 1976)

Other uses 

 Morris Canal, a defunct canal which once transported coal across northern New Jersey
 Morris station, a former railway station in Morris, Illinois
 Morris the Cat, mascot of the "9Lives" brand cat food
 the title character of Morris the Midget Moose, a Walt Disney animated short
 Morris Chair, an early type of reclining chair
 Morris College, a private liberal arts college in Sumter, South Carolina
 Morris High School (disambiguation)
 Morris Museum (disambiguation)
 Morris Performing Arts Center, South Bend, Indiana, on the National Register of Historic Places
 Morris Bridge, over the Illinois River at Morris, Illinois
 Morris dance, a traditional English dance form
 Morris worm, one of the first computer worms distributed via the Internet

See also 
 
 Three men's morris, a board game that may have existed in Egypt as early as 1400 BCE
 Nine men's morris, a board game that emerged from the Roman Empire, and the variant six men's morris
 Eleven men's morris, a European variation of Morabaraba that uses the same board but is played with eleven counters
 Twelve men's morris, a board game similar to Morabaraba
 Maurice (disambiguation)
 Morrice
 Morriston
 Morristown (disambiguation)
 Morrisville (disambiguation)